Kalia is one of two towns in Guinea with this name.  This is the one in Faranah Prefecture.  It is east of the capital Conakry near Faranah and near to the border with Sierra Leone.

Namesake 

The namesake town in Kalia, Gaoual, Guinea.

Mining 

There are iron ore deposits nearby.  The exploration company is Bellzone.

The port would be at Matakong.

A heavy duty standard gauge common user railway, shared with amongst others the Simandou (South) mine and Faranah mines, would be built.  The loaded trains will weigh about 20,000 t and there will also be fuel and container trains.

See also 

 Iron ore in Africa
 Railway stations in Guinea

References 

Populated places in Guinea